The 2014 Finnish Figure Skating Championships took place between December 13 and 15, 2013 at the Barona Areena in Espoo. Skaters competed in the disciplines of men's singles, ladies' singles, and ice dancing on the senior and junior levels. The results were one of the criteria used to choose the Finnish teams to the 2014 Winter Olympics, 2014 World Championships, 2014 European Championships, and 2014 World Junior Championships.

Senior results

Men

Ladies

Ice dance

External links
 2014 Finnish Championships results
 info

Finnish Figure Skating Championships
Finnish Figure Skating Championships, 2014
2013 in figure skating
2013 in Finnish sport
Finnish Figure Skating Championships, 2014